The 1982–83 NHL season was the 66th season of the National Hockey League. The New York Islanders won their fourth Stanley Cup in a row with their second consecutive finals sweep by beating the Edmonton Oilers four games to none. No team in any major professional North American sport has won four consecutive playoff championships since.

League business
Prior the start of the season, the Colorado Rockies moved to East Rutherford, New Jersey where they were renamed New Jersey Devils, leaving Denver without an NHL franchise until 1995. They were also moved to the Patrick Division, forcing the reluctant Winnipeg Jets to leave the Norris Division and take Colorado's place in the Smythe Division. This would be the last relocation of an NHL team and the last time a team would be transferred to a new division, until 1993. After the season, a last-minute sale of the St. Louis Blues to Harry Ornest prevented Wild Bill Hunter from purchasing that team and moving it to Saskatoon.

The Calgary Flames played their final season at the 7,000-plus seat Stampede Corral before moving into the Olympic Saddledome, which had a capacity of 16,605.

At the end of the season, the long pants worn by the Philadelphia Flyers and Hartford Whalers were banned, due to player safety concerns.

Regular season
The last remaining players from the Original Six era (prior to the Expansion Era)–Carol Vadnais, Serge Savard and Wayne Cashman–all retired after this season. Cashman was the last to play, losing in the Wales Conference Finals as a member of the Bruins.

The Boston Bruins led the league in overall points with 110. The defending Stanley Cup champion New York Islanders fell from first overall and finished tied for 6th overall and the high-powered, high offence, Edmonton Oilers tied for second overall. The Oilers set a new record, which they had set the previous year, for most goals in a season with 424 and were led by Wayne Gretzky's 196 points. The Oilers also tied the Boston Bruins' 1970–71 record for most 100-point players in one season as Wayne Gretzky, Glenn Anderson, Jari Kurri, and Mark Messier all scored more than 100 points.

The Washington Capitals qualified for the playoffs for the first time in franchise history.

Final standings

Prince of Wales Conference

Clarence Campbell Conference

Playoffs

The 1983 Playoffs marked the first time that seven NHL teams based in Canada (Montreal, Toronto, Vancouver, Edmonton, Quebec, Winnipeg, and Calgary) had qualified. Since the 1967–68 expansion, all the Canadian teams qualified for the playoffs on five other occasions – 1969 (Montreal and Toronto), 1975, 1976 and 1979 (Montreal, Toronto and Vancouver), and 1986 (the same seven as in 1983), the last time to date that all active Canadian teams qualified.

Playoff bracket

Stanley Cup Finals

Awards

All-Star teams

Source: NHL.

Player statistics

Scoring leaders
Note: GP = Games played; G = Goals; A = Assists; Pts = Points

Source: NHL.

Leading goaltenders

Note: GP = Games played; Min = Minutes played; GA = Goals against; GAA = Goals against average; W = Wins; L = Losses; T = Ties; SO = Shutouts

Coaches

Patrick Division
New Jersey Devils: Bill MacMillan
New York Islanders: Al Arbour
New York Rangers: Herb Brooks
Philadelphia Flyers: Pat Quinn
Pittsburgh Penguins: Eddie Johnston
Washington Capitals: Bryan Murray

Adams Division
Boston Bruins: Gerry Cheevers
Buffalo Sabres: Scotty Bowman
Hartford Whalers: Larry Kish, John Cunniff and Larry Pleau
Montreal Canadiens: Bob Berry
Quebec Nordiques: Michel Bergeron

Norris Division
Chicago Black Hawks: Orval Tessier
Detroit Red Wings: Nick Polano
Minnesota North Stars: Glen Sonmor
St. Louis Blues: Emile Francis and Barclay Plager
Toronto Maple Leafs: Mike Nykoluk

Smythe Division
Calgary Flames: Bob Johnson
Edmonton Oilers: Glen Sather
Los Angeles Kings: Don Perry
Vancouver Canucks: Roger Neilson
Winnipeg Jets: Tom Watt

Milestones

Debuts
The following is a list of players of note who played their first NHL game in 1982–83 (listed with their first team, asterisk(*) marks debut in playoffs):
Gord Kluzak, Boston Bruins
Dave Andreychuk, Buffalo Sabres
Phil Housley, Buffalo Sabres
Jamie Macoun, Calgary Flames
Murray Craven, Detroit Red Wings
Brian Bellows, Minnesota North Stars
Craig Ludwig, Montreal Canadiens
Mats Naslund, Montreal Canadiens
Pat Verbeek, New Jersey Devils
Bob Froese, Philadelphia Flyers
Dave Poulin, Philadelphia Flyers
Ron Sutter, Philadelphia Flyers
Rich Sutter, Pittsburgh Penguins
Gary Leeman*, Toronto Maple Leafs
Michel Petit, Vancouver Canucks
Patrik Sundstrom, Vancouver Canucks
Scott Stevens, Washington Capitals
Brian Hayward, Winnipeg Jets
Brian Mullen, Winnipeg Jets

Last games
The following is a list of players of note that played their last game in the NHL in 1982–83 (listed with their last team):
Wayne Cashman, Boston Bruins (Last player from the Original Six Era)
Gilles Gilbert, Detroit Red Wings
Reggie Leach, Detroit Red Wings
Garry Unger, Edmonton Oilers
Mike Murphy, Los Angeles Kings
Rejean Houle, Montreal Canadiens
Carol Vadnais, New Jersey Devils
John Davidson, New York Rangers
Ulf Nilsson, New York Rangers
Ian Turnbull, Pittsburgh Penguins
Jacques Richard, Quebec Nordiques
Marc Tardif, Quebec Nordiques
Vaclav Nedomansky, St. Louis Blues
Serge Savard, Winnipeg Jets

See also 
 List of Stanley Cup champions
 1982 NHL Entry Draft
 1982–83 NHL transactions
 35th National Hockey League All-Star Game
 National Hockey League All-Star Game
 1982 in sports
 1983 in sports
 NHL All-Rookie Team

References
 
 
 
 

Notes

External links
Hockey Database
NHL.com
hockey-reference

 
1
1